Redstone 2 may refer to:

 Mercury-Redstone 2, a 1961 test spaceflight
 Redstone 2, codename for the 2017 Microsoft Windows 10 version 1703 update